Vakilabad may refer to:
 Vakilabad, Ardabil, in Ardabil County, Ardabil Province, Iran
 Vakilabad, Fasa, in Fasa County, Fars Province, Iran
 Vakilabad, Sheshdeh and Qarah Bulaq, in Fasa County, Fars Province, Iran
 Vakilabad, Pasargad, in Pasargad County, Fars Province, Iran
 Vakilabad, Arzuiyeh, in Arzuiyeh County, Kerman Province, Iran
 Vakilabad Rural District, in Arzuiyeh County, Kerman Province, Iran
 Vakilabad, Baft, in Baft County, Kerman Province, Iran
 Vakilabad, Narmashir, in Narmashir County, Kerman Province, Iran
 Vakilabad, Qaleh Ganj, in Qaleh Ganj County, Kerman Province, Iran
 Vakilabad, Koshkuiyeh, in Rafsanjan County, Kerman Province, Iran
 Vakilabad, Rigan, in Rigan County, Kerman Province, Iran
 Vakilabad, Gavkan, in Rigan County, Kerman Province, Iran
 Vakilabad-e Pain Jam, in Razavi Khorasan Province, Iran
 Vakilabad Prison, in Mashhad, Iran